Scudder Parker (born August 16, 1943) is an American Democratic politician from Vermont. He served in the Vermont State Senate for eight years.

Career
Parker grew up on a dairy farm in N. Danville, in a region of Vermont known as the Northeast Kingdom.  Parker graduated Phi Beta Kappa from Williams College in 1965 and went on to receive his MDiv from Union Theological Seminary. Parker served as an ordained Protestant minister in UCC churches in East St. Johnsbury and Lower Waterford (1968-1989).  Early in his political career, Parker became the first Democratic Party candidate to win a Vermont State Senate seat in the northeastern region of Vermont.   He served four terms in the State Senate from 1981 to 1988.  In the Senate, Parker served as chair of the Finance Committee.  After serving in the Senate, Parker went on to become the Director of the Energy Efficiency Division of the Vermont Department of Public Service (1990-2003). Parker also served as the Chair of the Vermont Democratic Party (2001-2004). After running for office as the Democratic candidate for Governor of Vermont in the election of 2006, Parker worked for a year for Vermont Businesses for Social Responsibility.  Parker then worked for the Vermont Energy Investment Corporation (2008-2017), first as the Director of the Consulting Division and then as VEIC's Policy Director.  In retirement, Parker has become a published poet, with his first book of poetry, "Safe as Lightning" published in 2020 by Rootstock Publishing.

Race for governor, 2006 

In 2005, Parker announced his intention to run for the Democratic Party nomination for Governor of Vermont in the November 2006 Vermont gubernatorial election.  He was assured that nomination when no other Democrat filed by the July 16, 2006 deadline.

Parker started his campaign in the fall of 2005, visiting counties in Vermont and staying there for several days at a time.  In the summer of 2006, his campaign staff tripled in number, bringing on full-time field, finance, and communications directors, as well as several support staffers. He received $110,000 in donations in the month of July 2006.

The Parker campaign focused on several issues, including energy, education, health care, and economic development. He released a series of position papers on energy in support of renewable energy sources.

The Republican Party incumbent Jim Douglas defeated Parker, winning 56% of the vote to Parker's 41%.

References

External links
 https://www.scudderparker.net/

1943 births
Living people
Democratic Party Vermont state senators
Union Theological Seminary (New York City) alumni
Candidates in the 2006 United States elections
20th-century American politicians
21st-century American politicians